Víctor Manuel "Manolito" Ortiz Díaz (31 January 1965 – 3 November 2021) was a Puerto Rican politician and former mayor of Gurabo. Ortiz was affiliated with the New Progressive Party (PNP) and served as mayor from 2005 to 2016. Has BA degree in business administration from the University of Puerto Rico at Humacao.

On 7 December 2016, Ortiz was arrested for charges related to extortion and soliciting a bribe. He was suspended and later fired from his post as mayor. He was succeeded by Rosachely Rivera Santana.

Ortiz died on 3 November 2021.

References

1965 births
2021 deaths
Mayors of places in Puerto Rico
New Progressive Party (Puerto Rico) politicians
People from Gurabo, Puerto Rico